The 2010 Pacific hurricane season was one of the least active seasons on record, featuring the fewest named storms since 1977. The season officially started on May 15 in the eastern Pacific—east of 140°W—and on June 1 in the central Pacific—between the International Date Line and 140°W—and lasted until November 30. These dates typically cover the period of each year when most tropical cyclones form in the eastern Pacific basin. The season's first storm, Tropical Storm Agatha, developed on May 29; the season's final storm, Tropical Storm Omeka, degenerated on December 21.

The season began with record-breaking activity with four named storms, including two major hurricanes, developing by the end of June. Accumulated cyclone energy (ACE) values exceeded 300 percent of the average for the month of June. Activity abruptly diminished thereafter, with July, August, and September seeing record low storm development. The Eastern Pacific season proper ended with Tropical Storm Georgette's dissipation on September 23, a month before the climatological mean. The year's final cyclone, Omeka, developed in the off-season on December 18, marking a record-late formation date in the satellite-era. Although there were relatively few storms, the season proved exceptionally deadly and destructive. Torrential rains associated with Agatha and Eleven-E killed well over 200 people in Central America and Mexico and left more than $1.5 billion in damage.

Four time zones are utilized in the basin: Central for storms east of 106°W, Mountain between 114.9°W and 106°W, Pacific between 140°W and 115°W, and Hawaii–Aleutian for storms between the International Date Line and 140°W. However, for convenience, all information is listed by Coordinated Universal Time (UTC) first with the respective local time included in parentheses. This timeline includes information that was not operationally released, meaning that data from post-storm reviews by the National Hurricane Center, such as the subtropical phase of Omeka, is included. This timeline documents tropical cyclone formations, strengthening, weakening, landfalls, extratropical transitions, and dissipations during the season.

Timeline of events

May

May 15
The 2010 Pacific hurricane season officially begins.

May 29

00:00 UTC (7:00 p.m.
06:00 UTC (1:00 a.m.
18:00 UTC (1:00 p.m.
22:30 UTC (5:30 p.m. CDT) – Tropical Storm Agatha makes landfall near Champerico, Guatemala, just south of the Mexico–Guatemala border, while at peak strength.

May 30
06:00 UTC (1:00 a.m. CDT) – Agatha weakens to a tropical depression.
12:00 UTC (7:00 a.m. CDT) – Tropical Depression Agatha degenerates into a remnant low before subsequently dissipating six hours later over the high terrain of Guatemala.

June

June 1
The 2010 Central Pacific hurricane season officially begins.

June 16
06:00 UTC (1:00 a.m.
18:00 UTC (1:00 p.m.

June 17
06:00 UTC (1:00 a.m. CDT) – Tropical Depression Two-E rapidly dissipates off the coast of Mexico.
06:00 UTC (1:00 a.m.
12:00 UTC (7:00 a.m. CDT) – Observations from the ship Maersk Dhahran indicate that Three-E intensified into a tropical storm; the system was accordingly assigned the name Blas.

June 18
18:00 UTC (1:00 p.m.

June 19

12:00 UTC (6:00 a.m.
12:00 UTC (7:00 a.m.

June 20
18:00 UTC (1:00 p.m.

June 21
00:00 UTC (5:00 p.m.
18:00 UTC (11:00 a.m. PDT) – Tropical Depression Blas degenerates into a non-convective remnant low roughly 710 mi (1,145 km) southwest of the southern tip of Baja California Sur.

June 22
06:00 UTC (1:00 a.m.

June 23
00:00 UTC (6:00 p.m.
00:00 UTC (7:00 p.m.
06:00 UTC (1:00 a.m.
12:00 UTC (6:00 a.m.

June 24
06:00 UTC (1:00 a.m.
12:00 UTC (6:00 a.m.
18:00 UTC (12:00 p.m.

June 25
00:00 UTC (5:00 p.m.
06:00 UTC (1:00 a.m.
12:00 UTC (5:00 a.m.
12:00 UTC (7:00 a.m.
18:00 UTC (11:00 a.m.
21:00 UTC (4:00 p.m.

June 26
06:00 UTC (11:00 p.m. PDT, June 25) – Hurricane Celia weakens to Category 2 strength about 665 mi (1,070 km) west-southwest of Socorro Island.
12:00 UTC (7:00 a.m.
18:00 UTC (11:00 a.m. PDT) – Hurricane Celia weakens to Category 1 strength about 745 mi (1,200 km) west-southwest of Socorro Island.

June 27

00:00 UTC (5:00 p.m. PDT, June 26) – Hurricane Celia weakens to a tropical storm roughly 790 mi (1,270 km) west-southwest of Socorro Island.
00:00 UTC (7:00 p.m.
06:00 UTC (1:00 a.m.

June 28
12:00 UTC (7:00 a.m.
18:00 UTC (11:00 a.m. PDT) – Tropical Storm Celia degenerates into a non-convective remnant low approximately 1,035 mi (1,665 km) west-southwest of the southern tip of Baja California Sur.
18:00 UTC (1:00 p.m.

July

July 14
12:00 UTC (7:00 a.m.

July 16
18:00 UTC (12:00 a.m.

August

August 6

00:00 UTC (7:00 p.m.
12:00 UTC (7:00 a.m.

August 8
00:00 UTC (6:00 p.m.

August 9
18:00 UTC (12:00 p.m.

August 10
06:00 UTC (12:00 a.m.

August 20
06:00 UTC (12:00 a.m.
18:00 UTC (12:00 p.m.

August 21
18:00 UTC (12:00 p.m.
1800 UTC (1:00 p.m.

August 22

12:00 UTC (7:00 a.m.

August 25
12:00 UTC (7:00 a.m.

August 26
18:00 UTC (12:00 p.m.

August 27
06:00 UTC (12:00 a.m. MDT) – Hurricane Frank makes its closest approach to Socorro Island, passing within  to the southwest.
18:00 UTC (12:00 p.m.

August 28
12:00 UTC (6:00 a.m.
18:00 UTC (12:00 p.m.

September

September 3

00:00 UTC (6:00 p.m.
18:00 UTC (1:00 p.m.

September 4
07:00 UTC (8:00 p.m.
12:00 UTC (6:00 a.m.
18:00 UTC (1:00 p.m. CDT) – Tropical Depression Eleven-E degenerates into a remnant low while crossing the Isthmus of Tehuantepec.

September 5
18:00 UTC (1:00 p.m. CDT) – After emerging over the Bay of Campeche in the Atlantic basin, the remnants of Eleven-E regenerate into a tropical depression and later becomes Tropical Storm Hermine.

September 20
12:00 UTC (6:00 a.m.
18:00 UTC (12:00 p.m.

September 21

12:00 UTC (6:00 a.m.
18:00 UTC (12:00 p.m.

September 22
00:00 UTC (6:00 p.m. MDT, September 21) – Tropical Storm Georgette weakens to a tropical depression shortly before emerging over the Gulf of California to the east of La Paz.
22:00 UTC (4:00 p.m.

September 23
06:00 UTC (12:00 a.m. MDT) – Tropical Depression Georgette dissipates over the mountainous terrain of northwestern Mexico.

October

(No tropical cyclones developed in October.)

November

(No tropical cyclones developed in November.)

November 30
The 2010 Central and Eastern Pacific hurricane seasons officially end.

December

December 18

00:00 UTC (2:00 p.m. HST, December 17) – A subtropical depression develops from an extratropical cyclone approximately 1,330 mi (2,140 km) west-northwest of Honolulu, Hawaii.
12:00 UTC (2:00 a.m. HST) – The subtropical depression strengthens into a subtropical storm.

December 19
00:00 UTC (2:00 p.m. HST, December 18) – the subtropical storm crosses the International Date Line, exiting the basin.

December 20
06:00 UTC (8:00 p.m.

December 21
06:00 UTC (8:00 p.m.
12:00 UTC (2:00 a.m.

See also

2010 Pacific hurricane season
Pacific hurricane
Timeline of the 2010 Atlantic hurricane season

Footnotes

References

External links

 2010 Tropical Cyclone Advisory Archive, National Hurricane Center and Central Pacific Hurricane Center
 Hurricanes and Tropical Storms – Annual 2010, National Centers for Environmental Information

2010 Pacific hurricane season
Pacific hurricane meteorological timelines
2010 Epac T